Jadson (or Jádson) is a given name. Notable people with the name include:

Jádson, full name Jádson Rodrigues da Silva (born 1983), Brazilian footballer
Jadson André (born 1990), Brazilian surfer
Jadson (footballer, born August 1991), full name Jadson de Brito Lima, Brazilian footballer
Jadson (footballer, born November 1991), full name Jadson Cristiano Silva de Morais, Brazilian footballer
Jadson (footballer, born 1993), full name Jadson Alves dos Santos, Brazilian footballer
Jadson Viera (born 1981), Uruguayan former footballer and current coach

See also
 Jason (disambiguation)